João Zwetsch (born 12 November 1968) is a tennis coach and former professional tennis player from Brazil.

Biography

Tennis career
Born in São Leopoldo, Zwetsch began competing on tour in the late 1980s. His best performances on tour include finishing runner-up at the Lins Challenger in 1990 and making the second round of the Brasília Open ATP Tour tournament in 1991.

Zwetsch represented Brazil at the 1995 Pan American Games, where he partnered Gustavo Kuerten in the doubles event.

Coaching
Now a tennis coach, Zwetsch is a long serving captain of the Brazil Davis Cup team, which he has led since 2010. During his tenure he has twice captained Brazil in the World Group, the first time in 2013, then again in 2015 following a playoff win over Spain in São Paulo the year before.

He has previously been the individual coach of top 50 players Thomaz Bellucci and Flávio Saretta.

Zwetsch is currently coaching Thiago Seyboth Wild.

References

External links
 
 

1968 births
Living people
Brazilian male tennis players
Brazilian tennis coaches
People from São Leopoldo
Tennis players at the 1995 Pan American Games
Pan American Games competitors for Brazil
Sportspeople from Rio Grande do Sul